Sarai-Khas (affectionately known as "Biby Pind" and "Sarawa") is a village in Jalandhar district, Punjab, India. This small village has a population of approximately 7,000 people, many of whom are farmers. The village is situated 7 miles from Jalandhar, 2 miles from Kartarpur and ½ mile south of the GT Road.

Climate 
It has a humid subtropical climate with cool winters and hot summers. Summers last from April to June and winters from November to February. The climate is dry on the whole, except during the brief southwest monsoon season during July and August. The average annual rainfall is about 70 cm.

History 
This Village was founded by Atto Jatt Sarai (approximately 300+ years ago) and he had four sons named Uttam (Billa), Ram Ditta (Chela), Bura (Bura) & Bhagari (Bhagari). The village was subsequently divided into four Parts (Patti's) - Billa, Bura, Bhagari & Chela.

The original name of the village was Sarawan but due to similarity of names and to avoid confusion this village was renamed Sarai Khas from Sarawan after the Indo-Pak Partition. It has a population of more than 7000 which contains mostly farmers and many families living outside India.

Communities 

Alongside Sarai families, there are also to be found Bains, Gill, Kalyan, Mattu, Sandhu and Sanghera families who are ‘settlers’ in the village.

Many natives from Sarai Khas have settled abroad, notably in the UK,  USA and Canada. 

Villages in Jalandhar district
Census towns in Jalandhar district
Caravanserais in India